The Carteret ministry was the Whig government of Great Britain that held office from 1742 to 1744, following the defeat of the Walpole ministry by a margin of one vote. The nominal head of the ministry was Spencer Compton, 1st Earl of Wilmington, until his death in 1743. He was succeeded in the role of prime minister by Henry Pelham.

The ministry derives its name from John Carteret, 2nd Baron Carteret. He served as Northern Secretary throughout until his resignation, having been the mainstay of whom the respective prime ministers were dependent for support.

Ministry

Notes

References

Further reading

 

British ministries
Government
1742 establishments in Great Britain
1744 disestablishments in Great Britain
1740s in Great Britain
Ministries of George II of Great Britain